Kalitta Charters is an American charter airline based in Ypsilanti, Michigan, United States. Its main base is Willow Run Airport. The company is owned and run by Doug Kalitta, nephew of Kalitta Air founder Connie Kalitta. 
Kalitta Charters is now the sole company with a contract with the US government to fly service members' remains to their final resting places. Kalitta Charters offers Executive Charter, Air Ambulance & Air Cargo services, and a FAR Part 145 aircraft repair station at their operating facility in Ypsilanti, Michigan.
In August 2015, Kalitta Charters acquired AirNet.

Fleet 

The Kalitta Charters fleet comprises the following aircraft as of February 2023:

See also 
 Kalitta Air

References

External links 
 

Charter airlines of the United States
Companies based in Michigan
Cargo airlines of the United States
Airlines based in Michigan